Graeme Adam Owens (born 1 June 1988) is an English former professional footballer.

Career
Owens can play on either wing but prefers to play on the right. He was a member of Middlesbrough's FA Youth Cup winning side of 2004 at the age of 15.

After good performances for the reserve team, he was included in the first team squad for the trip to Bristol City in the FA Cup, and although he didn't make the final sixteen, manager Gareth Southgate suggested he was one to watch for the future.

Owens made his full debut in the League Cup against Tottenham Hotspur during the 2007–08 season.

In 2008, he spent a short spell on loan at Chesterfield  where he played four league games. On 8 January 2009, he signed for Championship club Blackpool on loan initially for one month, but with an option to extend it until the end of the season. He made his debut for the Seasiders as an 83rd-minute substitute in a 2–1 defeat to Coventry City at the Ricoh Arena on 17 January.

It was announced on 15 June 2009 that Owens had joined Scottish Premier League side Kilmarnock on a two-year deal.

After failing to make an impact at Kilmarnock, Owens was released on 31 January 2011. Owens joined Airdrie United on 3 March 2011. He was released by the club in May 2012.

References

External links

Graeme Owens profile at mfc.co.uk
Graeme Owens profile at blackpoolfc.co.uk

Living people
1988 births
English footballers
Chesterfield F.C. players
Middlesbrough F.C. players
Blackpool F.C. players
Kilmarnock F.C. players
Airdrieonians F.C. players
People from Cramlington
Footballers from Northumberland
Association football midfielders